Santoro is an Italian surname derived from Latin name Santorus (festum Omnium Sanctorum, "feast of all the saints"), and may refer to:

People with the surname 
 Alfredo Santoro, Argentine boxer
 Andrea Santoro, Italian Catholic priest
 Cláudio Santoro, Brazilian composer
 Eugenio Santoro, Swiss Italian sculptor
 Fabrice Santoro, French tennis player
 Francesco Raffaello Santoro, Italian painter
 Geraldine Santoro, American woman who died of a back-alley abortion in 1964
 Giulio Antonio Santoro, Roman Catholic prelate who served as Archbishop of Cosenza
 Giuseppe Santoro (diplomat), Italian lawyer and diplomat
 Giuseppe Santoro (general), Italian general
 Jorge Santoro, Brazilian professional football player and coach
 Leandro Santoro, Argentine politician
 Márcio Santoro, Brazilian co-president and co-founder of Agência África
 Matthew Santoro, Canadian YouTube personality
 Michele Santoro, Italian journalist
 Miguel Ángel Santoro, retired Argentine football goalkeeper and manager
 Roberto Jorge Santoro, Argentine poet
 Rodrigo Santoro, Brazilian actor
 Rubens Santoro, Italian painter
 Sal Santoro, American politician
 Salvatore Santoro (mobster), underboss of the Lucchese crime family
 Santo Santoro, Australian politician
 Vittorio Santoro, Italian/Swiss visual artist
 Walter Santoro, Uruguayan lawyer and politician

Fictional characters 
 Gabriel Santoro, a character in the novel Third and Indiana
 Nicky Santoro, a character in the film Casino
 Ofelia Santoro, a character in the novel Third and Indiana
 Rick Santoro, a character in the film Snake Eyes

Other use 
 An alternative name for wine made from the Trebbiano grape

See also
 Santori
 Santorio

Surnames

Latin-language surnames
Italian-language surnames
Patronymic surnames